Jatavarman Sundara I, also known as Sadayavarman Sundara Pandyan, was a emperor of the Pandyan dynasty who ruled regions of Tamilakkam (present day South India) between 1250–1268 CE. He is remembered for his patronage of the arts and tamil architecture, along with refurbishment and decoration of many Kovils (temple) in the Tamil continent. He oversaw a massive economic growth of the Pandyan empire. On the eve of his death in 1268 CE, the second Pandyan empire's power and territorial extent had risen to its zenith.

Accession
Sundara Pandyan I acceded to the Pandyan throne in the year 1251 CE. During the middle part of the 13th century, Pandya kingdom was ruled by many princes of the royal line. This practice of shared rule with one prince asserting primacy was common in the Pandyan Kingdom. The other princes of the Pandyan royal family with whom Sundara Pandyan I shared his rule were Maravarman Vikkiraman II and his brother Jatavarman Veera Pandyan I.

Historical background
By the middle of the 13th century, the Chola dynasty which had dominated Southern India over the past three centuries was declining. The last king of the Later Cholas, Rajendra Chola III reigned over a crumbling empire beset with rebellion and increasing external influence from Hoysalas and Kadavas. Previous rulers of the Pandyan kingdom like  Maravarman Sundara Pandyan I had succeeded in overthrowing Chola hegemony. Jatavarman annexed Kongu nadu and subdued Lingaya Gounder and made him his vassal. The Hoysala dominance over the Tamil Kingdoms had also waned by the time Sundara Pandyan I took power in 1251. He covered Entire Tamil Nadu which extended up to Nellore of present day Andhra Pradesh.

Conquests

Wars against Cheras and Cholas
Sundara Pandyan I first invaded the Chera country ruled by Viraravi Udaya Marthandavarman. The Chera army was defeated and their king killed in battle. Next he turned his attention to Cholas. Rajendra Chola III was defeated and accept Pandyan suzerainty.

Wars against Hoysalas
He invaded Hoysala dominions along the river kaveri and captured the fortress of Kannanur Koppam. Several Hoysala generals including Singana were killed and great amount of loot was captured along with many horses, elephants and gold treasure. This invasion was stopped after Someshwara withdrew into his kingdom. A later attempt by Someshwara to invade Pandyan kingdom in 1262 ended in his defeat and death. Jatavarman Veera Pandyan I became the governor of the captured territories.

Wars against Kadavas
Sundara Pandyan besieged the city fortress of Sendamangalam and fought with the Kadava king Kopperunchingan II. However he restored Kopperunchingan to his throne and gave him his country back. He also conquered Magadai and Kongu countries during his campaigns against Kadavas and Hoysalas

Invasion of Sri Lanka

Responding to an appeal for help from a minister in Sri Lanka, Jatavarman Sundara Pandyan intervened in 1258 and made Chandrabhanu of Tambralinga, a Savakan usurper of the Jaffna kingdom submit to Pandyan rule and annually offer precious jewels and elephants in tribute. A second attempt by  Chandrabhanu to invade the south of the island from the north prompted the Prince Jatavarman Veera Pandyan I, brother and lieutenant of Sundara Pandyan I to intervene again in 1262-1264 on Sundara Pandyan I's behalf. Chandrabhanu was killed in this conquest and the other king of the island was subjugated. Veera Pandyan I proceeded to plant the Pandyan bull victory flag at Koneswaram temple, Konamalai. Chandrabhanu's son Savakanmaindan was installed and submitted to Pandyan rule on the northern Tamil throne before he too was defeated upon Sundara Pandyan I's son Maravarman Kulasekara Pandyan I's, invasion in the late 1270s. Maravarman Kulasekara Pandyan I had succeeded his father as Lord Emperor of Pandyan following the latter's demise in 1268 and invaded to punish the Jaffna monarch for stopping the annual tributes he owed to his Pandyan overlords. The minister in charge of his invasion, Kulasekara Cinkaiariyan, an Aryachakravarthi, was installed as the new king of the island's north. The Aryacakravarti dynasty line of Jaffna rule thus began.

Expedition to the North
After subduing the Kadava Kopperunchingan II, Sundara Pandyan led an expedition to the North. Pandyan forces killed the Telugu ruler Vijaya Gandagopala and captured Kanchipuram in 1258. This bought them in conflict with the Kakatiyas under Ganapati II. Sundara Pandiyan I defeated a Telugu army at Mudugur in the current Nellore district and performed a virabisheka to commemorate the end of his campaign. However Ganapathi II later defeated Kopperunchingan II who was by then a Pandyan ally and recaptured territories up to Kanchipuram. The Kadava Pallava Kopperinjungan II was followed by very weak successors and Sundara Pandyan annexed Kanchi, Nellore and Visayavadai (modern Vijayawada) regions to the Pandyan Kingdom.

Patronage of temples

Sundara Pandyan used the vast treasure he got out of his wars to beautify the Siva temple in Chidambaram and the Vishnu temple in Srirangam. For gold plating the roofs of these two temples he was given the title of "pon veindha perumal"().He also gave many grants to temples in Trichy, Thanjavur and Kanchipuram. He built a temple at Aragalur (Magadai Mandalam) for the merit of Kulasekara around 1259. He acknowledged the contributors of other dynasties to Tamil Nadu by building a gate at the Sri Ranganathaswami Temple at Srirangam in which he engraved the names of all the four great empires of Tamil Nadu namely the Cholas, Pallavas, Pandyas and the Cheras. He also built the East tower of the Madurai Meenakshi Temple. He gold plated and placed the gold gilded Kalasam atop the gopurum of the Ananda Nilayam vimana of Tirumala Venkateswara Temple. In 1263 CE, he renovated the gopuram of Koneswaram temple and his son Veera Pandyan implanted the Pandyan victory flag and insignia of a "Double Fish" emblem at Konamalai.

Titles
Having vanquished his neighbours Sundara Pandyan took the titles like "Emmandalamum Kondaruliya Pandiya", "Tribhuvana Chakravarthy", "Ponveintha Perumal", and "Hemachadana Raja".

His Meikeerthi praises him as "the conqueror of Kongu Nadu and Eelam; the conqueror of the Ganges and Kaveri; Vanquisher of Hoysala; Subjugator of Kadava Kopperunchingan I; The one who paid victory tribute and bravery tribute at Chidambaram; The ruler of three worlds"

().

Death and succession
Sundara Pandyan I was succeeded by Maravarman Kulasekara Pandyan I in 1268 and died in 1271.

Notes

References

 
 
 
 

Pandyan kings
1268 deaths
Year of birth unknown
13th-century Indian monarchs
13th-century Hindus